Xylena tatajiana is a species of moth of the family Noctuidae. It is found in Taiwan.

Subspecies
Xylena tatajiana tatajiana
Xylena tatajiana pectinicornis Hreblay & Ronkay, 1998

References

Moths described in 1991
Cuculliinae